Alessandra Gorla (born 1 November 1975) is an Italian softball player who competed in the 2000 Summer Olympics.

References

1975 births
Living people
Italian softball players
Olympic softball players of Italy
Softball players at the 2000 Summer Olympics
Place of birth missing (living people)